Domina Vacanze is an Italian hotel group who has sponsored multiple cycling teams:

 Aurum Hotels (1996–2007), known as Domina Vacanze in 2004
 De Nardi (1999–2005), known as Domina Vacanze in 2005